RGF may refer to:

Really Good Friends, sub-group of members of the World Trade Organization
Romanian Gymnastics Federation